The 1948 United States presidential election in Alabama was held on November 2, 1948. The national Democratic Party nominee, incumbent president Harry S. Truman, did not appear on the ballot in the state, with the Alabama Democratic Party instead opting to field far-right South Carolina Governor Strom Thurmond as a Dixiecrat candidate. The state Supreme Court ruled that any statute requiring party presidential electors to vote for that party's national nominee was void. A "Loyalist" group did petition governor "Big Jim" Folsom to allow Truman electors, but Senator John Sparkman, fearing popular defeat at the hands of the Dixiecrats and a hostile state legislature, decided against placing Truman electors on the ballot.

In other Southern states where Truman was on the ballot, Thurmond was forced to run under the label of the States' Rights Democratic Party.

In Alabama, voters voted for electors individually instead of as a slate, as in the other states.

Thurmond overwhelmingly won Alabama by a margin of 60.71 percent, or 130,513 votes, against his closest opponent, Republican New York governor Thomas E. Dewey. Two third-party candidates, Henry A. Wallace of the Progressive Party and Claude A. Watson of the Prohibition Party, appeared on the ballot in Alabama, though neither had any impact on the election.

Analysis 
Southern Democrats walked out at the party's national convention in Philadelphia because of Truman's endorsement of civil rights for African Americans. This segregationist faction met on July 17, 1948, in Birmingham, nominating South Carolina governor Strom Thurmond as its nominee for president. Mississippi governor Fielding L. Wright was nominated for vice president.

Thurmond won 66 of Alabama's 67 counties, with the sole holdout being in the northern part of the state where Winston County gave Dewey over sixty percent of the vote.

Results

Results by county

See also
United States presidential elections in Alabama

References

Notes

1948
Alabama
1948 Alabama elections